Handwritten is the fourth studio album and major label debut by American rock band the Gaslight Anthem, released on July 20, 2012, through Mercury Records. Produced by Brendan O'Brien, the album was preceded by its lead single, "45", and features liner notes by Nick Hornby.

Writing
As of July 2010, Brian Fallon said he was working on new material for a fourth album. Subsequently, Fallon stated on his blog that the band would start writing their record in January 2011. However, prior to playing at Pinkpop in June 2011, Fallon stated that they had just started working on the new album and that it would not be released for at least a few months. In the same interview, Fallon said the band's next record would sound closer to their breakthrough record, The '59 Sound, rather than American Slang. During this time, Fallon was also working with good friend Ian Perkins, putting the finishing touches on their side project the Horrible Crowes.

On October 6, 2011, the Gaslight Anthem announced via Facebook that they had officially signed with Mercury Records. They stated that they were sorry to leave their friends at SideOneDummy Records, but felt that the change was necessary for their musical career.

Recording
On October 14, 2011, the Gaslight Anthem announced that their last show before going into the studio to record their new album would be on December 9 at the Asbury Park Convention Hall.

On January 12, 2012, the band announced via their Twitter feed that they would be recording the following week in Nashville. Recording took place at Blackbird Studios, Nashville. On February 17, 2012, they announced that recording of original songs for the album had been completed and they would soon be recording b-sides and covers. It was announced on February 22, 2012, via the band's Twitter feed that their fourth album would be titled Handwritten.

The band announced on their official Facebook page on April 26, 2012, that the album's lead single would be "45", and it would be receive its worldwide premiere as Zane Lowe's Hottest Record in the World on BBC Radio 1 on April 30.

On April 30, 2012, the band announced that the album would be released July 23, 2012, in the UK and July 24 in the US.

Critical reception

Handwritten received mostly positive reviews from music critics. At Metacritic, which assigns a "weighted average" rating out of 100 from selected independent ratings and reviews from mainstream critics, the album received a Metascore of 71/100, based on 31 reviews, indicating "generally favorable reviews."

The New Jersey Devils use the song "Howl" as their goal song.

Commercial performance
Handwritten debuted at No. 3 on the US Billboard 200 chart, selling 40,000 copies in its first week of release. It remains the band's highest positioned album on the Billboard 200 chart and best sales week to date.

Music videos
The Gaslight Anthem released a music video for their track "Here Comes My Man" featuring actress Elisha Cuthbert.

Track listing

Credits and personnel
The Gaslight Anthem
 Brian Fallon – lead vocals, guitar
 Alex Rosamilia – guitar, backing vocals
 Alex Levine – bass guitar, backing vocals
 Benny Horowitz – drums, percussion, backing vocals

Additional musicians
 Ian Perkins – guitar, backing vocals
 Brendan O'Brien – guitar, backing vocals, Hammond B-3 organ, piano, percussion
 Patrick Warren – string arrangement, keyboard on "National Anthem"

Production
 Brendan O'Brien – record producer, mixing engineer
 Nick DiDia – recording engineer
 Bob Ludwig – audio mastering
 Danny Clinch – photography
 El Jefe Design – art direction, design, layout

Charts

Weekly charts

Year-end charts

Certifications

|}

Release history

References

2012 albums
Albums produced by Brendan O'Brien (record producer)
The Gaslight Anthem albums
Mercury Records albums
Hard rock albums by American artists
Hardcore punk albums by American artists